Urmitz is a municipality in the district of Mayen-Koblenz in Rhineland-Palatinate, western Germany.
In the 4th millennium BC it contained one of the largest fortified settlements of the time. This archaeological site has since been destroyed by modern construction.

Local council
The local council has 20 members.

The elections in 2014 showed the following results.

References

Municipalities in Rhineland-Palatinate
Mayen-Koblenz